The Republican Party of Florida (RPOF) is the affiliate of the Republican Party in the U.S. state of Florida.

Although Florida was dominated by the Democratic Party for most of its history (like most southern states), the Republican Party has rapidly gained ground in recent decades, and is now the state's dominant party. After the results of the 2022 elections, the party took control of every statewide office for the first time since Reconstruction. It controls the governorship, all state executive offices, both U.S. Senate seats, and supermajorities in its U.S. House delegation and in both houses of the state legislature.

History
Several of Florida's governors and U.S. senators were Republican after the American Civil War, during the Reconstruction era. Afterwards,  Florida's state politics were largely dominated by Democrats until Richard Nixon's Southern Strategy, which took advantage of objections to the advances of the American Civil Rights Movement. This resulted in a regional political realignment for the Southern United States.

In 1967, Claude R. Kirk, Jr. was the first Republican governor elected in the state since the 19th century Reconstruction era. And after Nixon's victory in 1968, the state only voted Democratic in presidential elections in 1976 (Jimmy Carter) 1996 (Bill Clinton), 2008 and 2012 (Barack Obama). The 2000 presidential election was decided by a margin of 537 votes out of approximately 6 million cast, giving George W. Bush the presidency over Al Gore.

The Florida Senate was still dominated by Democrats until 1992, when a majority of Republicans was elected. The Florida House of Representatives turned Republican after the November 1996 election. Since then, the number of Democrats in both chambers have continued to drop.

The Florida Legislature became the first legislature in any of the states of the former Confederacy to come under complete Republican control when the Republicans gained control of the House and Senate in the 1996 election. However, in the 2006 election the Democrats actually gained seats in the State House, the first instance of this occurring since the early 1980s.

Current structure and composition
In the 2014 election, the Republican nominee for Governor was Governor of Florida Rick Scott. He defeated the Democratic nominee, who was the Former Governor of Florida, Charlie Crist who was once elected as a Republican.

The current Chairman of the Republican Party of Florida is Christian Ziegler by RPOF members in February 2023.

The Republican National Committee (RNC) is responsible for promoting Republican campaign activities. It is responsible for developing and promoting the Republican political platform, as well as coordinating fundraising and election strategy. Senator Mel Martinez of Florida is the Republican Party's former General Chairman. Ronna McDaniel is the current Chairman of RNC. The chairman of the RNC is chosen by the President when the Republicans have the White House or otherwise by the Party's state committees. The RNC, under the direction of the party's presidential candidate, supervises the Republican National Convention, raises funds, and coordinates campaign strategy. On the local level there are similar state committees in every state and most large cities, counties and legislative districts, but they have far less money and influence than the national body.

The Republican House and Senate caucuses have separate fund raising and strategy committees. The National Republican Congressional Committee (NRCC) assists in House races, and the National Republican Senatorial Committee (NRSC) in Senate races. They each raise over $100 million per election cycle, and play important roles in recruiting strong state candidates. The Republican Governors Association (RGA) is a discussion group that seldom funds state races.

Current ideology

The membership of the Republican Party is primarily made up of fiscal conservatives, social conservatives, neoconservatives, and members of the Christian right.

Economic policies
Republicans favor free-market policies supporting business and oppose increases to the minimum wage.

Republicans are generally opposed to a single-payer healthcare system, such as that found in Canada or in most of Europe. They also oppose the Affordable Care Act and the expansion of Medicaid under the Act.

Republicans oppose labor unions and have supported right-to-work legislation.

Social policies
Most of the Republicans' national and state candidates oppose abortion and same-sex marriage, favor capital punishment, and support gun ownership rights.

Republicans advocate for charter schools and school vouchers; many have denounced the performance of public schools.

Socially conservative Republicans support voluntary organized prayer in public schools and the inclusion of teaching creationism or intelligent design alongside evolution.

Controversy

In April 2010, the party began investigating $1.3 million in questionable expenses incurred by a former party staffer, Melanie Phister. From 2006 to 2009, the party gave her an American Express credit card on which she charged the expenses for herself and her colleagues. The expenses included: $40,000 at a London, England hotel; $20,000 for plane tickets for indicted former Florida House Speaker Ray Sansom, his wife and children; $19,000 for the Water Club restaurant in New York; $15,000 for a one-month's stay at a Miami Beach hotel, and, $66,000 for chartered flights. The Republican Party of Florida has hired the accounting firm Alston + Bird LLP to investigate the party's finances, including the questionable credit card expenses.

The party issued a September 2009 press release about Obama's planned TV presentation to schoolchildren: "Schoolchildren across the nation will be forced to watch the president justify his plans for government-run health care, banks, and automobile companies, increasing taxes on those who create jobs, and racking up more debt than any other president." Politifact said, "There remains no evidence that Obama intends to discuss the controversial policy issues of health care, banking, the automotive industry, taxes or the national debt during his address to students."

In an October 2008 mailing, the party alleged ""Barack Obama has consistently voted against tougher penalties for criminals." Politifact found that the party had taken selective votes or positions to prop up sensational headlines that are belied by a fuller examination of Obama's record, and found the ad's claim false.

In May 2008, the party claimed in an email that Cuban leader Fidel Castro endorsed Obama. Politifact found that to be false, and added it "...comes off less like a joke and more like an intentional smear."

Symbols and name

The mascot symbol, historically, is the elephant. A political cartoon by Thomas Nast, published in Harper's Weekly on November 7, 1874, is considered the first important use of the symbol. In the early 20th century, the usual symbol of the Republican Party in Midwestern states such as Indiana and Ohio was the eagle, as opposed to the Democratic rooster. This symbol still appears on Indiana ballots.

After the 2000 election, the color red became associated with the GOP although it has not been officially adopted by the party. On election night 2000, for the first time ever, all major broadcast networks utilized the same color scheme for the electoral map: red states for George W. Bush (Republican nominee) and blue states for Al Gore (Democratic nominee). Although the color red is unofficial and informal, it is widely recognized by the media and the public to represent the GOP. Partisan supporters now often use the color red for promotional materials and campaign merchandise.

Lincoln Day, Reagan Day, or Lincoln-Reagan Day, is the primary annual fundraising celebration held by many state and county organizations of the Republican Party. The events are named after Republican Presidents Abraham Lincoln and Ronald Reagan.

Current elected officials

Member of Congress

U.S. Senate

U.S. House of Representatives

Statewide offices

Governor: Ron DeSantis 
Lieutenant Governor: Jeanette Núñez
Attorney General: Ashley Moody
CFO: Jimmy Patronis
Commissioner of Agriculture : Wilton Simpson

Former Florida governors and U.S. senators

Governors

United States senators

Former RPOF Chairs

Blaise Ingoglia (2015–2019)
Leslie Dougher (2014–2015)
Lenny Curry (2011–2014)
David Bitner (2011)
John Thrasher (2010–2011)
Jim Greer (2006–2010)
Carole Jean Jordan (2003–2006)
Al Cardenas (1999–2003)
Tom Slade (1993–1999)
Van B. Poole (1989–1993)
Jeanie Austin (1984–1989)
G. Harold Alexander (1952–1964)

See also

Florida Democratic Party
Political party strength in the United States
Political party strength in Florida

References

External links
Republican Party of Florida
National Republican Committee

Florida
Politics of Florida
Political parties in Florida
Florida Republicans
1867 establishments in Florida
Political parties established in 1867